Wallingford Mendelson (29 December 1872 – 19 August 1902) was a New Zealand cricketer, rugby player and athlete of the 1890s, who became a lawyer.

Life and career
Wally Mendelson was one of several children of Julius Mendelson, who was the first postmaster in Temuka, in the South Canterbury region, in 1869. He was educated at Christ's College, Christchurch, and the University of Otago, where he graduated with a BA in 1892. A batsman, he played one first-class match for Canterbury in 1893-94. He won the New Zealand long jump championship in 1893.

He then studied law at Jesus College, Cambridge. He played rugby for Cambridge, winning his Blue in 1894, 1895 and 1896. He also won an athletics Blue in 1895, when he defeated Oxford University's champion athlete C. B. Fry in the long jump. He was admitted to the Bar at the Inner Temple in 1897.

Mendelson returned to New Zealand and practised law in Temuka, where he was an influential player and administrator in cricket and rugby in the South Canterbury region. Opening the batting for South Canterbury against Canterbury in a two-day match in December 1899 he scored 26 not out, carrying his bat in a total of 44 all out.

He moved to South Africa in May 1902, intending to live there permanently, but he contracted myelitis and died in hospital in Durban a few weeks after arriving.

References

External links
 
 Wally Mendelson at CricketArchive

1872 births
1902 deaths
People from Geraldine, New Zealand
People educated at Christ's College, Christchurch
University of Otago alumni
Alumni of Jesus College, Cambridge
New Zealand cricketers
New Zealand male long jumpers
Canterbury cricketers
New Zealand rugby union players
Cambridge University R.U.F.C. players
New Zealand emigrants to South Africa
Cricketers from Canterbury, New Zealand